Album Album is a 1984 jazz album by Jack DeJohnette’s Special Edition featuring five compositions by DeJohnette and a cover of Thelonious Monk's "Monk's Mood". A JazzTimes reviewer selected it in 2012 as one of DeJohnette's key albums.

Track listing
All compositions by Jack DeJohnette except where noted.

Side one
"Ahmad the Terrible" – 6:08
"Monk's Mood" (Thelonious Monk) – 7:41
"Festival" – 6:08

Side two
"New Orleans Strut" – 6:49
"Third World Anthem" – 10:51
"Zoot Suite" – 5:02

Personnel
Jack DeJohnette – synthesizer, guitar, drums, keyboards
Howard Johnson – tuba, baritone saxophone
David Murray – tenor saxophone
John Purcell – alto saxophone and soprano saxophone
Rufus Reid – bass guitar and double bass
Dave Baker – recording engineer

References

1984 albums
Jack DeJohnette albums
ECM Records albums